Thraco-Macedonian is a conventional name in the study of ancient history to describe the political geography of Macedonia (region) in antiquity. It may refer to:

Thraco-Macedonian coins or Thraco-Macedonian standard. Ancient Greek coins of Thracian tribes (or tribes who have been labelled as Thracian) in Macedonia (region), like those of Bergaios and Derrones. The earliest coins date in the 6th century BC from the mine district of Pangaion Hills. In style and types they bear a resemblance to another series of coins conjecturally assigned to Thasos. Thraco-Macedonian may also include types of coins from Greek city-states in Macedonia (region). Later when the whole region was annexed to the Macedonian kingdom, some  coins of cities and tribes continued to be minted and circulated. So an appropriate and clarifying term for coins minted by the kingdom is 'Macedonian royal coinage'.
Thraco-Macedonian region. Usually  it comprises the geographical region of East Macedonia, modern Serres, Kavala, Drama and Blagoevgrad provinces (ancient regions of Bisaltia, Odomantike, Sintike, Edonis and Maedike. However, it may also include ancient regions of central Macedonia, also known as Thrace in antiquity (between Homeric geography and 4th century BC); Chalcidice, Mygdonia and Pieria. As an example, even the Late Roman era writer Stephanus places Methone of Pieria and Torone of Chalcidice, in Thrace.
Thraco-Macedonian mythology Greek mythology of Macedonia with Thracian characters or related mythology to the Thracian tribes of Macedonia (like the tomb of Orpheus in Pieria and Bisaltes).

See also
Thracians
Macedonia (region)
Thracian phoros
Thrakomakedones
East Macedonia and Thrace

References

Greece in the making, 1200-479 BC By Robin Osborne
Coins of the Ancient Thracians by Yordanka Yurokova
Agoranomia: studies in money and exchange presented to John H. Kroll By John H. Kroll, Peter G. Van Alfen

External links
Ancient Coinage of Thraco Macedonian Tribes
The mints of the 'Thraco-macedonian' people
Coins of Macedonia and Thrace

Ancient Macedonia
Ancient Thrace
Coins of ancient Greece
Ancient Greek geography